Gary O. Pihl (pronounced "peel") (born November 21, 1950) is an American rock musician and guitarist best known for playing with Sammy Hagar and the hard rock band Boston.

Biography 
Gary Pihl was born in Chicago, Illinois, where he lived the first 12 years of his life. In 1963 his family relocated to San Mateo, California, where Pihl would become active in music and a participant in a number of local bands. Gary graduated from Hillsdale High School.

At his home recording studio, Pihl worked with the founding members of a band that would eventually be called "Night Ranger." They recorded demos for their first and second albums (Dawn Patrol and Midnight Madness, respectively) at his home studio. Night Ranger was initially called "Ranger," but the band found that the name was already being used by another band and changed it prior to the first album release.

He also played with several other bands including Day Blindness, Fox, Crossfire (Steve Jones, Mitchell Froom, David Froom, Phil Marshall with Jeff Dorenfeld as manager; Crossfire also performed with Norman Greenbaum as lead singer for several years.), Stark Raving Mad (Gary on lead vocals and guitar, Donovan Stark, Paul Taylor (later of Winger), Jay Causbrook, and David Payne, with Eric Martin of Mr. Big joining after Gary left, among other players), and Alliance. (Note: There have been several different bands named Alliance.)

Crossfire featured an ARP Odyssey and ARP String Ensemble played by Mitchell Froom (who would later become known for the soundtrack to "La Bamba" and other films while also producing bands in LA). Crossfire's seminal moment was their performance at the Stop the Dam Concert held at Sonoma State College, (now Sonoma State University). The concert was to raise awareness and funds to stop the Army Corps of Engineers construction of the Lake Sonoma Dam project in Geyserville's Dry Creek Valley.

Before leaving Stark Raving Mad to join Sammy Hagar, he was known for songs such as "Olga on the Volga."

Sammy Hagar was the opening act at the end of Boston's first tour in 1977 and opened the whole second tour in 1978/79. It was on those tours that Pihl met Tom Scholz. The two of them found out how much they had in common with their extensive home studios and techniques. It set up a lifelong bond and a few years later Tom asked Pihl to join Boston, after Hagar decided to join Van Halen.

After Jeff Dorenfeld became manager for Boston, Pihl made other introductions including Doug Huffman, another drummer from Sebastopol in Sonoma County when Boston needed a replacement, and still later, bassist David Sikes from Fairfield, California near Sonoma County.

Discography

with Day Blindness 
 Day Blindness (1969)

with FOX 
 San Francisco Session (1970)

with Sammy Hagar 
 Musical Chairs (1977)
 All Night Long (1978)
 Street Machine (1979)
 Danger Zone (1980)
 Loud & Clear (1980)
 Standing Hampton (1981)
 Three Lock Box (1982)
 Live 1980 (1983)
 VOA (1984)

with Boston 
 Third Stage (1986)
 Walk On (1994)
 Greatest Hits (1997)
 Corporate America (2002)
 Life, Love & Hope (2013)

with Alliance 
 Alliance (1997)
 Missing Piece (1999)
 Road To Heaven (2008)

with Color Three 
 Paint By Number (2013)

with All 41 
 The World's Best Hope (2017)

References 

Boston (band) members
American rock guitarists
American male guitarists
Living people
1950 births
American session musicians
Sammy Hagar & the Waboritas members
Guitarists from Chicago
20th-century American guitarists